Henry Sylvester Crapper (15 January 1905 – 28 December 1976) was an Australian rules footballer who played with Melbourne in the Victorian Football League (VFL).

Family
The son of Henry Crapper (1871-1952), and Winifred Crapper (1875-1951), née Fitzgerald, Henry Sylvester Crapper was born at Raywood, Victoria on 15 January 1905.

His brothers, Thomas Frederick "Fred" Crapper (1909-1976), Francis Gerald "Frank" Crapper (1911-1991), played VFL football with Richmond and North Melbourne, respectively.

He married Veronica Cecilia Carrodus (1906-1993) in 1935.

Football
Recruited by Melbourne from the Castlemaine Football Club in the Bendigo Football League in 1930, he played his first senior game, against Footscray on 31 May 1930.

He was a member of the Melbourne Second XVIII team that won the Grand Final, against Geelong on 10 October 1931.

Military service
He served as a Flight Lieutenant in the Royal Australian Air Force (RAAF) in World War II.

Death
He died at the Royal Melbourne Hospital in Parkville, Victoria on 28 December 1976.

Notes

References
 
 World War Two Nominal Roll: Flight Lieutenant Henry Sylvester Crapper (12838), Department of Veterans' Affairs.

External links 

 
Demonwiki profile

1905 births
Australian rules footballers from Victoria (Australia)
Melbourne Football Club players
Castlemaine Football Club players
1976 deaths
Royal Australian Air Force personnel of World War II
Royal Australian Air Force officers